Bennouna is a surname. Notable people with the surname include:

Khnata Bennouna (born 1940), Moroccan author of novels and short stories
Mehdi Bennouna, Moroccan nationalist, writer and journalist
Mohamed Bennouna (born 1943), Moroccan diplomat and jurist

Arabic-language surnames